Strange Stories is a 1953 British drama film directed by Don Chaffey and John Guillermin and starring Peter Bull, Naomi Chance and Valentine Dyall.

It consists of two stories, The Strange Mr Bartleby and The Strange Journey. The stories were sometimes show individually on television.

Cast
 Peter Bull as Captain Breen  
 Naomi Chance as Young woman  
 Valentine Dyall as Storyteller / Narrator  
 Helen Horton as Marie  
 John Laurie as Mr. Bartleby  
 Norman Shelley as Mr. Gilkie  
 John Slater as Storyteller / Narrator  
 Colin Tapley as Charles

References

Bibliography
 James Monaco. The Encyclopedia of Film. Perigee Books, 1991.

External links

1953 films
British drama films
1953 drama films
1950s English-language films
Films directed by Don Chaffey
Films directed by John Guillermin
British black-and-white films
1950s British films